Cyperus feani is a species of sedge that is native to parts of the Marquesas Islands.

See also 
 List of Cyperus species

References 

feani
Plants described in 1931
Flora of the Marquesas Islands
Taxa named by Forest B.H. Brown